Mikel Lejarza Ortiz (born 1956) is a Spanish audiovisual producer. He became the president of A3 Films (later Atresmedia Cine) in 2010.

Biography 
Mikel Lejarza Ortiz was born in Bilbao in 1956. He earned a licenciate degree in Geography and History from the Complutense University of Madrid and a PhD in Communication Sciences from the University of Deusto. He began a career as a journalist working for El Correo and Radio Popular. He earned a post in ETB in 1983 after passing competitive examination, later working for Tele 5 and Grupo Árbol. He joined Grupo Antena 3 in 2006, helming the company's film studio (Antena 3 Films/Atresmedia Cine) after 2010.

Filmography 

Producer

 Marshland (2014)
 Toro (2016)  
 Smoke & Mirrors (2016)
 May God Save Us (2016)
 The Queen of Spain (2016)
 The Invisible Guest (2016)
 The Bar (2017)
 Gold (2017)
 The Realm (2018)
 Klaus (2019)

References 

People from Bilbao
Spanish film producers
1956 births

Living people